The Azerbaijani Wikipedia is a Wikipedia in Azerbaijani language, launched in January 2002. The editorial process is being supported by eighteen bots.

Within the first two years of its creation the Azerbaijani Wikipedia reached 3,000 articles. As of November 2010, the local list of requested articles contains ten entries (seven biographical, two scientific and one unspecified). Pending November 2010 translation requests comprise three English and three Turkish entries.

The categorization is maintained through nine topic categories: culture, geography, history, life, mathematics, nature, science, society and technology. Hidden categories embrace 111 entries. The backlog category contains 14 subcategories. 

There are also fourteen portals about architecture, biology, chemistry, history, Islam, geography, literature, medicine, philosophy, Azerbaijani cinema, Azerbaijani military, as well as country-specific ones about Georgia, Turkey and Azerbaijan itself.

Azerbaijani Wikipedia is constantly increasing its number of articles, but at some point in 2015 this number somewhat decreased, returning to values smaller than 100,000.

History 

In 2010, Azerbaijani Wikipedia published work from books by professor Rasim Aliguliyev and senior scientist Irada Alakbarova. The book was edited by Alovsat Aliyev.

The article timeline
 2 June 2002 – Creation of first section in Azerbaijani Wikipedia.
 9 March 2007 – 5 000 articles.
 22 July 2007 – 10 000 articles.
 29 July 2011 – 75 000 articles (5 819 of them in Arabic alphabet). 75 000th article صفی‌خانلو (in Arabic alphabet) was written by user E THP.
 17 September 2012 – 90 000 articles.
 25 March 2014 – 100 000 articles.

Community efforts

The first meetup was held in Baku on 6 December 2009. The event was organized in order to establish relations of friendship and familiarity between Wikipedians and a number of other issues – including technical problems and prospects for future development.

In order to solve the problems, an emergency meeting was organized on 23 October 2010 in Baku. About 9 users participated in it.

Logo

References

External links 

  Azerbaijani Wikipedia
  Azerbaijani Wikipedia mobile version

Azerbaijani-language encyclopedias
Science and technology in Azerbaijan
Wikipedias by language
Internet properties established in 2002
Azerbaijani-language websites